Andrew William Van Hekken (born July 31, 1979) is an American former professional baseball pitcher.

Early years
He attended Lakeview Elementary School and later Holland High School in Michigan.

Professional career
Van Hekken was drafted by the Seattle Mariners in the third round of the 1998 MLB draft.

In 1999, he was traded to the Detroit Tigers along with Jerry Amador for Brian Hunter. He made his Major League debut in September 2002. In his first Major League appearance, he threw a complete game shutout for a victory against the Cleveland Indians. As of March 2017, he was the last Major League pitcher to pitch a complete game shutout in his debut. In 5 starts for the Tigers, he sported an ERA of 3.00 in 30 innings pitched, he had the same amount of strikeouts (5) as starts (5). He finished with a 1.5 K/9. He would never be called up to the Majors again in his career.

After becoming a free agent in 2004, Van Hekken has bounced around multiple organizations. From 2005 to 2011 he has pitched for Cincinnati Reds, Atlanta Braves, Florida Marlins, Kansas City Royals and the Houston Astros. With Houston, he remained with them from 2008 to 2011, pitching no higher than Triple-A.

Van Hekken signed a one-year contract for the 2014 season with the Nexen Heroes for his second season with the team in the Korea Baseball Organization. In 2016, he signed with the Seibu Lions of the Pacific League in Nippon Professional Baseball. He was released on July 15. Van Hekken returned to the Nexen Heroes for the remainder of the 2016 season and the 2017 season. He became a free agent following the 2017 season.

On April 17, 2018, Van Hekken signed with the New Britain Bees of the Atlantic League of Professional Baseball. He left the team on August 14, 2018, to sign with the Uni-President Lions of the Chinese Professional Baseball League.

Van Hekken retired following the 2018 season.

References

 Holland native Andy Van Hekken honored to join Whitecaps Hall of Fame | MLive.com
 Andy Van Hekken…3148 Days and Counting – Ultimate Astros

External links

Career statistics and player information from Korea Baseball Organization

1979 births
Living people
American expatriate baseball players in Japan
American expatriate baseball players in Mexico
American expatriate baseball players in South Korea
American expatriate baseball players in Taiwan
American people of Dutch descent
Arizona League Mariners players
Baseball players at the 2011 Pan American Games
Baseball players from Michigan
Chattanooga Lookouts players
Corpus Christi Hooks players
Detroit Tigers players
Erie SeaWolves players
KBO League pitchers
Kiwoom Heroes players
Lakeland Tigers players
Louisville Bats players
Major League Baseball pitchers
Mexican League baseball pitchers
Mississippi Braves players
Navegantes del Magallanes players
American expatriate baseball players in Venezuela
New Britain Bees players
Nippon Professional Baseball pitchers
Oklahoma City RedHawks players
Omaha Royals players
Oneonta Tigers players
Pan American Games medalists in baseball
Pan American Games silver medalists for the United States
People from Holland, Michigan
Richmond Braves players
Round Rock Express players
Saitama Seibu Lions players
Somerset Patriots players
Toledo Mud Hens players
United States national baseball team players
Vaqueros Laguna players
West Michigan Whitecaps players
Medalists at the 2011 Pan American Games
American expatriate baseball players in the Dominican Republic
Estrellas Orientales players
Macoto Cobras players
Uni-President 7-Eleven Lions players